Antonovna is a Russian surname. Notable people with the surname include:

Catherine Antonovna of Brunswick (1741–1807), Russian nobility
Elizabeth Antonovna of Brunswick (1743–1782), Russian nobility

See also

Patronymic surnames
Russian-language surnames